Acropolis is a 1933 play by American playwright Robert E. Sherwood.

Plays by Robert E. Sherwood
1933 plays